Treberth is a suburb within the electoral ward of Ringland, Newport. Treberth used to be a Post War Development in Ringland, Newport until the prefabs were demolished and modern housing was built in its place many years after they had been built.

References

Districts of Newport, Wales